Mài is a Chinese surname. It is commonly transliterated as Mak in Hong Kong, based on the Cantonese pronunciation, though other transliterations exist. "麥" is the standard character in both Traditional and Simplified scripts but 麦 is also a variant seen in a both. The meaning of the Chinese character is either wheat or barley. According to a 2013 study,  麦 was the 200th most common surname, shared by 550,000 people or 0.041% of the population,  with Guangdong being the province with the most.

Notable people 

 Alan Mak, Hong Kong director
 Alan Mak, British politician
 Alice Mak, the Secretary for Home and Youth Affairs of Hong Kong
 Alice Mak, Chinese cartoonist and creator of McMug/McDull
 Juno Mak, Hong Kong singer
 Karl Maka, (Chinese: 麥嘉) Hong Kong film producer, director, actor, and presenter.
 Bow-sim Mark, (Chinese: 麥寶嬋) martial arts grandmaster, credited with popularizing the term “Wushu” outside of China, mother of martial arts film star Donnie Yen.
 Teresa Mak, Hong Kong actress, known for the role of Fang Yi (方怡) in The Duke of Mount Deer
 Dennis Mak, Hong Kong singer
 Tak Wah Mak, Chinese Canadian award-winning researcher known for discovery of the T-cell receptor
 Evergreen Mak Cheung-ching, Hong Kong TVB actor
 Mai Yinghao (born Panyu District, Guangdong), Chinese archaeologist
 Prince Mak, singer
 Mak Chai-kwong, Former Secretary for Development of Hong Kong

See also
 Mai (name)
 Mai (disambiguation)

Chinese-language surnames
Individual Chinese surnames